Harrietfield is a village near Glenalmond in Perth and Kinross. It has been suggested that the village was built in 1822 as a planned community for mill workers

Amenities 

The village is home to The Drumtochty Tavern, which is thought to be around 200 years old. The tavern is closed at present. There was also a Free Church of Scotland in the village until 1995, when it was closed.

References 

Villages in Perth and Kinross